Boujdour Province is a province in the Moroccan occupied region of Laâyoune-Sakia El Hamra, Western Sahara. Its population in 2004 was 46,129. Its major town is Boujdour.

Its territory, which is part of Western Sahara claimed by both Morocco and the Polisario Front, has been de facto administered by Morocco since the mid-1970s.

Location

The prefecture of Boujdour is located in the north of the region of Laâyoune-Sakia El Hamra.

It is bordered by:
 Laâyoune and Es Semara provinces to the north
 Mauritania to the east
 Oued Ed-Dahab province to the south
 Atlantic Ocean to the west.

History

The province of Boujdour was created by the dahir establishing the law of 6 August 1976, after the Green March of 1975 leading to the Madrid agreements which divided Western Sahara in two. 
The Spanish region of Seguia el-Hamra was entrusted to Morocco while that of Río de Oro to Mauritania. 
Like the provinces of Laâyoune and Es Semara, the province of Boujdour was created on 6 August 1976.

When it was created, the province of Boujdour had 2 circles which included 4 caïdats and the rural communes Bir Anzarane, Oum Dreyga, Boujdour and Gueltat Zemmour.

Subdivisions
The province is divided administratively into the following:

Population

In 2014 the population was 50,566, of which 42,651 were urban and 7,915 were rural.
The town of Boujdour had 42,651 inhabitants, Gueltat Zemmour had 6,383, Jraifa 950 and Lamssid 572.
Population growth:

References

Sources

 
Boujdour Province